Tautovo is the name of several rural localities in Russia:
Tautovo, Chuvash Republic, a village in Tautovskoye Rural Settlement of Alikovsky District of the Chuvash Republic
Tautovo, Kirov Oblast, a village in Vikharevsky Rural Okrug of Kilmezsky District of Kirov Oblast